Caney Valley USD 436 is a public unified school district headquartered in Caney, Kansas, United States.  The district includes the communities of Caney, Havana, Niotaze, Tyro, Wayside, and nearby rural areas.

Schools
The school district operates the following schools:
 Caney Valley Jr/Sr High School.
 Lincoln Memorial Elementary School.

See also
 Kansas State Department of Education
 Kansas State High School Activities Association
 List of high schools in Kansas
 List of unified school districts in Kansas

References

External links
 

School districts in Kansas
Education in Montgomery County, Kansas